Michael Peter George (18 December 1888 – 10 June 1957) was an Australian rules footballer who played with Melbourne in the Victorian Football League (VFL). He was cleared to Victorian Football Association side Prahran in 1919.

Notes

External links 

 

1888 births
1957 deaths
Australian rules footballers from Melbourne
Melbourne Football Club players
Prahran Football Club players
People from Nunawading, Victoria